Ice Mother is a 2017 Czech drama film directed by Bohdan Sláma. It was selected as the Czech entry for the Best Foreign Language Film at the 90th Academy Awards, but it was not nominated.

Plot
Hana, a happy 67-year-old mother and grandmother, experiences a series of life-changing events.

Cast
 Zuzana Kronerová as Hana
 Pavel Nový as Broňa
 Václav Neužil as Ivan
 Tatiana Vilhelmová as Kateřina
 Petra Špalková as Věra
 Marek Daniel as Petr
 Alena Mihulová as Zuzana
 Marie Ludvíková as Květa
 Božena Černá as Boženka
 Josef Ježek as Bohouš

See also
 List of submissions to the 90th Academy Awards for Best Foreign Language Film
 List of Czech submissions for the Academy Award for Best Foreign Language Film

References

External links
 

2017 films
2017 drama films
Czech drama films
2010s Czech-language films
Czech Lion Awards winners (films)